Brook Kennedy is an Australian former professional rugby league footballer who played for the Brisbane Broncos and Penrith Panthers.

Kennedy played for Brisbane Easts, before making his first-grade debut for the Broncos in 1988. Following two NSWRL seasons at Brisbane, he moved to Penrith where he featured more regularly. He played 13 first-grade games across 1990 and 1991 for the Panthers, mostly as a lock.

References

Living people
Australian rugby league players
Brisbane Broncos players
Penrith Panthers players
Eastern Suburbs Tigers players
Rugby league locks
Year of birth missing (living people)